Sršen is a South Slavic surname found in Croatia and Slovenia.

It is one of the most common surnames in the Dubrovnik-Neretva County of Croatia.

It may refer to:

 Adalita Srsen (born 1971), Australian singer of Croatian descent
 Ana Sršen (born 1973), Croatian swimmer
 Eva Sršen (born 1951), Slovenian singer
 Vanesa Sršen (born 1971), Croatian volleyball player

References

Croatian surnames
Slavic-language surnames